Hey, Look Me Over may refer to:

 "Hey, Look Me Over", a song from the musical Wildcat, whose tune was adapted into one of Louisiana State University's school songs, "Hey, Fightin’ Tigers"
 "Hey, Look Me Over" (M*A*S*H episode)
 "Hey, Look Me Over", an episode of The Golden Girls